Felis may refer to:
 Felis, a genus of cats in the family Felidae, including the domestic cat and its closest wild relatives
 Felis Britannica, the United Kingdom Member of the Fédération Internationale Féline
 Felis, the proper name of the star HD 85951 in the constellation of Hydra.
 Felis (constellation), a now-obsolete constellation created by Jérôme Lalande in 1799
 Riggu Felis, an anthropomorphic wildcat in the Redwall series by Brian Jacques
 Stefano Felis (ca. 1538-1603), a Neapolitan Italian composer 
 "-felis", a suffix used to denote cats in taxonomy